Choft Sar or Cheft Sar may refer to:
 Choft Sar, Babol
 Choft Sar, Qaem Shahr
 Cheft Sar, Sari